Mitsuo Tsukahara (塚原 光男 Tsukahara Mitsuo, born December 22, 1947) is a Japanese artistic gymnast. He was five times an Olympic Gold Medalist. He remained active in the sport after his retirement from competition. He served as vice president of the Japan Gymnastic Association.

Tsukahara competed throughout the late 1960s and 1970s, retiring from gymnastics competition in 1978 after the World Championships. Winning five gold, one silver and three bronze medals, Tsukahara was an important contributor in Japan's win at the team competition in three consecutive Olympic Games: in 1968, 1972 and 1976. He married fellow gymnast Chieko Oda. He has remained connected to the gymnastics world, partly through his son Naoya Tsukahara, who was also a multi-medalist at the World Championships and Olympic Games throughout the late 1990s and who still competed as of 2014.

Skills

Tsukahara's name is one of the most famous in gymnastics due to its association with two widely performed skills. The first is the full-twisting double salto in the tuck position (with the full twist in the first salto). The Men's Gymnastics Code of Points credits Tsukahara for premiering this skill on floor exercise and horizontal bar, and he regularly performed it on these events throughout his career. In fact, in many nations, it is customary to call a full-twisting double salto tumble or dismount a "Tsukahara" on all apparatus, both for men and women. This skill is sometimes called a "Moon Somersault" or "Moon Salto".

Tsukahara is also credited with having invented a vaulting technique called the "Tsukahara vault". This vault is generally described as a roundoff over the horse/table into a backward salto, with or without twist. However, until 2005, when the horse was replaced with a table, women usually performed Tsukahara-type vaults on the side horse with a half-twist entry onto the horse rather than a quarter twist entry. Tsukahara himself did this vault in a stretched position, generally without twist.

The name "Tsukahara" is so strongly associated with the 1/4-on entry, that it is routinely misapplied to the more commonly used Kasamatsu-style vault, in which the 1/4 turn off the horse "untwists" so that the salto is initiated forwards or sideways. In fact, Tsukahara himself, who entered the horse on his left side but also twisted to the left, would have done a Kasamatsu vault if he had tried to twist. However, the Tsukahara style is certainly still very popular among gymnasts who:
 do the basic vault in tucked, piked, or stretched position
 twist the opposite direction of their entry side, e.g. Gervasio Deferr, who repeated as Olympic Vault Champion in 2004 by premiering the Tsukahara with 2.5 twists
 do two saltos instead of just one, e.g. Leszek Blanik, the 2008 Olympic Vault Champion, who is one of many gymnasts to perform a Tsukahara double pike.

Honors
In November 2009, Tsukahara was awarded with a Medal of Honour with purple ribbon by the Government of Japan.

See also
List of multiple Olympic gold medalists
List of multiple Summer Olympic medalists

References

External links
 Tsukahara (Horizontal bar)
 Tsukahara (Vault)

1947 births
Living people
Japanese male artistic gymnasts
Olympic gymnasts of Japan
Gymnasts at the 1968 Summer Olympics
Gymnasts at the 1972 Summer Olympics
Gymnasts at the 1976 Summer Olympics
Originators of elements in artistic gymnastics
World champion gymnasts
Medalists at the World Artistic Gymnastics Championships
Nippon Sport Science University alumni
Olympic medalists in gymnastics
Medalists at the 1976 Summer Olympics
Medalists at the 1972 Summer Olympics
Medalists at the 1968 Summer Olympics
Olympic gold medalists for Japan
Olympic silver medalists for Japan
Olympic bronze medalists for Japan
Recipients of the Medal with Purple Ribbon
Gymnasts from Tokyo